Nateby is a village and civil parish in the Eden district of Cumbria, England. The parish had a population of 110 in 2001, increasing to 120 at the 2011 Census.

Historically part of Westmorland, it lies 3 miles from the border of North Yorkshire. Since 2016 the village has been on the northern boundary of the Yorkshire Dales National Park. Nearby are the Nine Standards Rigg hills. The village contains a popular country pub, The Black Bull Inn, a garage/petrol station and a small metal-yard.

See also

Listed buildings in Nateby, Cumbria

References

External links
 Cumbria County History Trust: Nateby (nb: provisional research only – see Talk page)

Villages in Cumbria
Civil parishes in Cumbria
Eden District